Depressaria halophilella is a moth of the family Depressariidae. It is found in France and on Sicily.

The wingspan is 15–16 mm.

The larvae feed on Crithmum maritimum.

References

External links
lepiforum.de

Moths described in 1908
Depressaria
Moths of Europe